Joseph Edward Connolly (December 3, 1887 – 1973) was a Canadian politician. He served in the Legislative Assembly of New Brunswick as member of the Liberal party from 1940 to 1960. He also served as mayor of Bathurst, New Brunswick from 1931 to 1932, 1937 to 1938 and 1942 to 1944.

Connolly was also a prominent curler, having played in the 1931, 1932, 1938 and 1942 Briers for New Brunswick.

References

1887 births
1973 deaths
New Brunswick Liberal Association MLAs
Curlers from New Brunswick
Canadian sportsperson-politicians
Canadian male curlers
Mayors of Bathurst, New Brunswick